Trebeništa is an ancient necropolis dating from the Iron Age, i.e. around the 7th century BC. The site is located near Trebeništa in modern-day North Macedonia. It is believed that the necropolis was used by the people from the ancient town of Lychnidos. Whether product of Illyrian, Thracian, or a mixed Thraco-Aegean civilization, its characteristics suggests some cultural continuity throughout a wide area, despite there lived different tribes.

Modern discovery
Trebeništa was discovered by Bulgarian soldiers during World War I Bulgarian occupation of Kingdom of Serbia in 1918. The Bulgarian government sent the archaeologist Karel Škorpil to organize excavations. The artifacts were later researched by the archaeologist  Bogdan Filov. Since then, large amounts of graves, five golden masks, and some iron earrings and plates have been found. The excavations continued in 1930-1934, 1953-1954 and 1972 in Yugoslavia. The finds are housed now in the Archaeological Museums in Ohrid, Sofia and Belgrade.

A number of artifacts excavated in the necropolis are said to be imported from ancient Greece while the rest are of a local Thracian-barbarian origin with Greek influences. Archeological findings include a bronze Krater, a Corinthian helmet, Illyrian type helmets and golden funeral masks reminiscent of Aegean culture.

A corrupt passage from Greek historian Strabo suggests that the Thraco-Illyrian tribe of Peresadyes and the Illyrian tribe of the Enchelei allied to create a new state in the area of modern Ohrid. If that suggestion is correct then the royal cemetery located in the necropolis is that of the Peresadyes.

A golden mask from Trebeništa is depicted on the obverse of the 500 Macedonian denar banknote, issued in 1996 and 2003.

See also
 Nikola Vulić

Sources

Bibliography
 B.D.Filow, K.Schkorpil, Die archaische Nekropole von Trebenischte am Ochrida-See, Berlin und Leipzig 1927.
 La nécropole archaïque de Trebenischte, Extr. de la Revue Archéo., janvier-avril 1934. Vulic (N.)
 WERE THE AUTHORS OF THE TREBENIŠTE CULTURE AND THE GOLD FUNERAL MASKS, Nade Proeva, Ph.D.
 Viktorija Sokolovska, Etnickite nositeli na Trebeniskata Nekropola, Skopje/Ohrid 1997 (Summary in English)

Archaeological sites in North Macedonia
Ohrid Municipality
Ancient Macedonia
Archaeology of Illyria